Voitheia! O Vengos faneros praktor 000 is a 1967 Greek spy comedy film directed by Thanasis Vengos, written by Napoleon Eleftheriou, and Nikos Tsiforos,  and starring Thanasis Vengos, Zannino, Dimitris Nikolaidis,  and Antonis Papadopoulos. The film was shot in black-and-white.

The film was successful at the box office and was followed by a sequel, Thou-Vou falakros praktor, epiheirisis "Yis Mathiam" (1969).

Title
The film title means Help! It is Vengos visible agent '000''', in humorous reference to secret agents (1964). At the time Room 000 meant the public toilet.

The title character is codenamed Thou-Vou (. "Thou" stands for Theta, "Vou" stands for Beta. They form the Greek initials of protagonist Thanasis Vengos (Θανάσης Βέγγος, pronounced: Thanássis Végos).

Plot

The protagonist is Athanasios Bobas (Thanasis Vengos), codenamed Thou-Vou. He is a secret agent in training, one of seven students of a spy school named after James Bond. He is trained in Karate, target practice, track and field, etc. He is, however, thoroughly inept. His trainer Zannino consistently grades him with 0.

In order to graduate and receive his degree, Thou-Vou has to successfully complete three missions. He has to put in practice what he has learned so far. He is to be rated with a grade from 0 to 9. His grades will form the three numbers of his new codename. His first mission involves the beautiful daughter of a cantor. The girl is having a secret affair, and Thou-Vou has to find out who her lover is.

His second mission involves a  fashion company. Someone has been stealing its patterns and Thou-Vou has to uncover the culprits. The third mission is to recover a secret document which has been hidden away in a cake. He fails spectacularly in each mission and is rated with 0. He graduates with the disappointing number of 000.

 Cast 
Thanasis Veggos ..... Thou-VouZannino ..... trainerDimitris Nikolaidis ..... chief agent 627000Periklis Christoforidis ..... school directorNitsa Tsaganea ..... Mrs. PsaltiLavrentis Dianellos ..... Mr. PsaltisNikos Fermas ..... instructor of theoryTakis Miliadis ..... ManolisRia Deltoutsi ..... DoraKostas Mentis ..... Sou-PouTakis Christoforidis ..... provisions directorAntonis Papadopoulos ..... Map 031Giannis Sparidis ..... assistant to Thou-VouKostas Papachristos ..... police officerKostas Stavrinoudakis ..... Sou-TouMitsi Konstantara ..... designer house directorBetty Dakopoulou ..... kindergarten teacher''

External links

1967 films
1960s Greek-language films
Greek comedy films
Films directed by Thanasis Vengos
Greek black-and-white films
1960s spy comedy films
1967 comedy films
Parody films based on James Bond films